Onjuku Dam is an earthfill dam located in Chiba Prefecture in Japan. The dam is used for water supply. The catchment area of the dam is 0.6 km2. The dam impounds about 12  ha of land when full and can store 610 thousand cubic meters of water. The construction of the dam was started on 1970 and completed in 1977.

References

Dams in Chiba Prefecture
1977 establishments in Japan